Asia D'Amato (born 7 February 2003) is an Italian artistic gymnast.  She represented Italy at the 2020 Olympic Games.  She was a member of the teams that won bronze at the 2019 World Championships and gold at the 2022 European Championships. Individually she is the 2021 World vault silver medalist, the 2022 European all-around champion and vault silver medalist, the 2019 and 2020 Italian national champion, and the 2018 Junior European vault champion. She is a member of the Italian National Team and is the twin sister of Alice D'Amato.

Early life
D'Amato and her twin sister, Alice, were born in Genoa, Italy on 7 February 2003. She and her sister began gymnastics at the age of 7 at the Andrea Doria Sports Club in Genoa, Italy. They currently train at the International Academy of Brixia in Brescia.

In December 2020, Alice and Asia received the Athlete of the Year award in the Liguria region of Italy.

Gymnastics career

Junior

2015 - 2017 
D'Amato made her international debut at the 2015 City of Jesolo Trophy as part of Italy's Young Dreams team alongside Giorgia Villa.

In 2017 D'Amato competed at the Italian National Championships where she placed first on vault, second on floor exercise, and third on uneven bars.  She later competed at the 2017 European Youth Olympic Festival alongside Elisa Iorio and Alice D'Amato.  There she helped Italy win silver behind Russia.  Individually she placed second in the all-around behind Ksenia Klimenko of Russia, third on vault behind Valeria Saifulina of Russia and Denisa Golgotă of Romania, third on uneven bars behind Iorio and Klimenko, and second on balance beam behind Klimenko.

2018
D'Amato competed at the City of Jesolo Trophy in April where Italy placed first in the team competition. She continued her national and international dominance on vault, winning gold at International Gymnix, all Italian Serie A competitions, and at the Youth Olympic Games Qualifier.  In August D'Amato competed at the 2018 European Women's Artistic Gymnastics Championships alongside Alice D'Amato, Alessia Federici, Elisa Iorio, and Giorgia Villa where Italy won team gold and individually D'Amato won gold on vault.

Senior

2019
In April D'Amato was officially named to the team to compete at the 2019 European Championships alongside Giorgia Villa, Elisa Iorio and Alice D'Amato.  During qualifications she placed eleventh in the all-around but did not qualify to the final due to Alice D'Amato and Giorgia Villa scoring higher.  She qualified to the vault final in fourth place.  During finals she once again finished in fourth, behind Maria Paseka of Russia, Coline Devillard of France, and Ellie Downie of Great Britain.

In August D'Amato competed at the Heerenveen Friendly where she helped Italy win gold in the team competition ahead of the Netherlands and Norway and individually she finished fifth in the all-around behind Giorgia Villa, Eythora Thorsdottir, Naomi Visser, and Alice D'Amato.  Additionally she recorded the third highest vault and balance beam scores.  On September 4 D'Amato was named to the team to compete at the 2019 World Championships in Stuttgart, Germany alongside her sister, Villa, Elisa Iorio, and Desirée Carofiglio.

During qualifications at the World Championships D'Amato helped Italy qualify to the team final in eighth place; as a result Italy also qualified to the 2020 Olympic Games in Tokyo.  She scored high enough to become the second reserve for the all-around final but did not due to teammates Villa and Iorio scoring higher than her. In the team final, D'Amato helped Italy win the bronze medal – Italy's first team medal since the 1950 World Artistic Gymnastics Championships.  They ended up finishing behind the United States and Russia but ahead of China, who originally qualified to the final in second place.

2020
In late January it was announced that D'Amato would compete at the Stuttgart World Cup taking place in March.  The Stuttgart World Cup was later canceled due to the COVID-19 pandemic in Germany.  In November D'Amato competed at the Italian National Championships where she tied for first with Giorgia Villa.  During event finals she won gold on vault, bronze on the uneven bars (behind Villa and Martina Maggio) and on balance beam (behind Maggio and Villa), and silver on floor exercise once again behind Villa.

2021
D'Amato was named to the team to represent Italy at the 2020 Summer Olympics alongside Alice D'Amato, Giorgia Villa (later replaced by Vanessa Ferrari), and Martina Maggio. The team qualified for the team finals and placed fourth with a total score of 163.638.  In October D'Amato was selected to compete at the 2021 World Championships.  While there she qualified to the all-around and vault finals, becoming the first Italian female gymnast to qualify to the latter.  During the vault final she performed a Yurchenko double and a half on full twist. She won the silver medal behind reigning Olympic vault champion Rebeca Andrade. This was Italy's first World medal on vault in women's artistic gymnastics.

2022 
D'Amato competed at the DTB Pokal Team Challenge.  Her scores on vault, uneven bars, and balance beam contributed towards Italy's second-place finish.  Individually D'Amato won silver on vault.  D'Amato next competed at the City of Jesolo Trophy.  She helped Italy finish second as a team and individually placed second in the all-around behind Konnor McClain.  During event finals she finished second on vault behind Coline Devillard, fifth on balance beam, and sixth on uneven bars.

In June D'Amato competed at the Mediterranean Games alongside Angela Andreoli, Alice D'Amato, Martina Maggio, and Giorgia Villa.  Together they won gold in the team competition, over five points ahead of second place France.  Individually D'Amato won silver in the all-around and on balance beam behind compatriot Maggio and won gold on vault and floor exercise.

D'Amato next competed at the European Championships.  On the first day of competition she won gold in the all-around ahead of Alice Kinsella of Great Britain and compatriot Maggio.  She is the second Italian woman to win the all-around title after Vanessa Ferrari did so in 2007.  Additionally D'Amato helped Italy qualify to the team final in first place and individually she qualified to the vault and balance beam finals.  During the team final D'Amato contributed scores on all four apparatuses towards Italy's first place finish.  During event finals D'Amato won silver on vault behind Zsófia Kovács.  D'Amato injured her ankle when landing her second vault and therefore withdrew from the balance beam final.  An MRI later revealed that D'Amato would need to undergo surgery to repair ankle ligaments and she would be unable to compete at the upcoming World Championships.

Competitive history

References

External links
 

2003 births
Living people
Italian female artistic gymnasts
Sportspeople from Genoa
Medalists at the World Artistic Gymnastics Championships
European champions in gymnastics
Italian twins
Twin sportspeople
Gymnasts at the 2020 Summer Olympics
Olympic gymnasts of Italy
Mediterranean Games gold medalists for Italy
Mediterranean Games silver medalists for Italy
Mediterranean Games medalists in gymnastics
Gymnasts at the 2022 Mediterranean Games
21st-century Italian women